is a train station located in Fushimi-ku, Kyoto, Kyoto Prefecture, Japan.

Lines
Keihan Electric Railway
Uji Line

Layout
The station has two side platforms serving two tracks.

Adjacent stations

References

Railway stations in Kyoto